The Northwest Missourian is a weekly student newspaper at Northwest Missouri State University in Maryville, Missouri.

It is distributed every Thursday (except during the summer), and covers both campus and community news and sporting events. Coverage includes Community News, University News, Community Sports, University Sports and Features. The Missourian is advised by Director of Student Publications Steven Chappell.

The newspaper has won numerous awards, including the prestigious Pacemaker Award. The online version, www.nwmissourinews.com, is also a Pacemaker winner.

References

External links
Official Website

Student newspapers published in Missouri
Northwest Missouri State University